Music Speaks is a 2014 album by Candice Glover

Music Speaks, or Music Speaks Louder than Words may refer to:
Music Speaks Louder Than Words, album by Russian and American musicians, 1990
Music Speaks Louder Than Words, album by Candi Staton 1977
Music Speaks Louder Than Words (James Blood Ulmer album), 1997
"Music Speaks Louder Than Words", song by Candi Staton, written by H. Payne, M. Scarpiello, E. Pease
And the Music Speaks, album by All-4-One 1995